William 'Bill' H. Carris (born August 23, 1944) is an American politician from Vermont.

Early life, education and military service
Carris was born on August 23, 1944 in Hanover, New Hampshire. He is a graduate of Rutland High School in 1963 and Castleton State College. He served in the United States Army and was stationed in Germany for two years. In 1969, he held the rank of specialist and was stationed at Landstuhl.

Career
Carris, a Democrat, is a  former member of the Vermont Senate representing Rutland County.  

From 2012 to 2013, Carris was Senate Majority Leader of the Vermont Senate. He was succeeded in this position by Chittenden County Senator Philip Baruth.

He joined the family business Carris Reels, Inc. in 1971, a company that manufactures reels started by his father Henry Carris in 1951. The company became Carris Financial Corporation.

References

 

1944 births
Living people
People from Hanover, New Hampshire
People from Rutland County, Vermont
Castleton State College alumni
Majority leaders of the Vermont Senate
Vermont Democrats
United States Army soldiers